Madeleine Laissac (28 July 1900, Béziers - 18 March 1971) was a French politician. She represented the French Section of the Workers' International (SFIO) in the National Assembly from 1951 to 1955.  She was also mayor of Saint-Nazaire-de-Ladarez, in Herault, from 1947 to 1971.

References

1900 births
1971 deaths
People from Béziers
Politicians from Occitania (administrative region)
French Section of the Workers' International politicians
Deputies of the 2nd National Assembly of the French Fourth Republic
Women members of the National Assembly (France)
20th-century French women